The 23rd Cannes Film Festival ran from 3 to 18 May 1970.  This year, Robert Favre LeBret, the founder of the festival, decided not to include any films from Russia and Japan (their flags were missing on the Croisette).  He was tired of the "Slavic spectacles and Japanese samurai flicks.". The Russians took back their juror Sergei Obraztsov (head of Moscow puppet theater) and left the jury panel with only eight members.

Nobel Prize for Literature winner Miguel Ángel Asturias was appointed as President of the Jury. At the time, he was serving as ambassador from Guatemala to France. The Palme d'Or went to the MASH by Robert Altman. The festival opened with Les Choses de la vie, directed by Claude Sautet and closed with Le Bal du Comte d'Orgel, directed by Marc Allégret.

Jury
The following people were appointed as the Jury of the 1970 film competition:

Feature films
Miguel Ángel Asturias (Guatemalan Nobel Prize) Jury President
Guglielmo Biraghi, critic (Italy)
Kirk Douglas, actor (USA)
Christine Gouze-Rénal, producer (France)
Vojtěch Jasný, director (Czechoslovakia)
Félicien Marceau, playwright (France)
Sergey Obraztsov, puppeteer (Soviet Union)
Karel Reisz, filmmaker (UK)
Volker Schlöndorff, filmmaker (West Germany)
Short films
Fred Orain (producer)
Jerzy Płażewski, critic (Poland)
Vincio Delleani (Italy)

Official selection

In competition - Feature film
The following feature films competed for the Grand Prix du Festival International du Film:

The Alienist (Azyllo Muito Louco) by Nelson Pereira dos Santos
The Buttercup Chain by Robert Ellis Miller
Don Segundo Sombra by Manuel Antín
The Dreamer (Ha-Timhoni) by Dan Wolman
Elise, or Real Life (Élise ou la vraie vie) by Michel Drach
The Falcons (Magasiskola) by István Gaál
Fruit of Paradise (Ovoce stromu rajských jíme) by Věra Chytilová
Harry Munter by Kjell Grede
Hoa-Binh by Raoul Coutard
Investigation of a Citizen Above Suspicion (Indagine su un cittadino al di sopra di ogni sospetto) by Elio Petri
The Land (Al-Ard) by Youssef Chahine
Landscape After the Battle (Krajobraz po bitwie) by Andrzej Wajda
Last Leap (Le dernier saut) by Édouard Luntz
Leo the Last by John Boorman
Long Live the Bride and Groom (¡Vivan los novios!) by Luis García Berlanga
Malatesta by Peter Lilienthal
MASH by Robert Altman
Metello by Mauro Bolognini
The Palace of Angels (O Palácio dos Anjos) by Walter Hugo Khouri
The Pizza Triangle (Dramma della gelosia - tutti i particolari in cronaca) by Ettore Scola
A Simple Story (Une si simple histoire) by Abdellatif Ben Ammar
The Strawberry Statement by Stuart Hagmann
Tell Me That You Love Me, Junie Moon by Otto Preminger
The Things of Life (Les Choses de la vie) by Claude Sautet
Tulips of Haarlem (I tulipani di Haarlem) by Franco Brusati

Films out of competition
The following films were selected to be screened out of competition:

 The Ball of Count Orgel (Le Bal du Comte d'Orgel) by Marc Allégret
 Mictlan o la casa de los que ya no son by Raúl Kamffer
 The Territory of Others (Le territoire des autres) by Gérard Vienne, Jacqueline Lecompte, Michel Fano and François Bel
 They Shoot Horses, Don't They? by Sydney Pollack
 Tristana by Luis Buñuel
 The Virgin and the Gypsy by Christopher Miles
 Voyage Chez Les Vivants by Henry Brandt
 Woodstock by Michael Wadleigh

Short film competition
The following short films competed for the Prix du Jury:

 A Day With the Boys by Volker Schlöndorff
 Comme Larrons En Foire by Edmond Freess
 El diablo sin dama by Eduardo Calcagno
 Et Salammbo? by Jean-Pierre Richard
 Gipsy Pentecost (The Feast of St. Sara) by Laurence Boulting
 Kaleidoski by Jacques Ertaud
 L'autre silence by Nestor Matsas
 Light (Lumière) by Paul Cohen
 Magic Machines by Bob Curtis
 Smrtici vone (Le parfum mortel) by Vaclav Bedrich
 The Epitaph by Gurucharan Singh
 Un temps pour la mémoire by Georges Pessis

Parallel sections

International Critics' Week
The following films were screened for the 9th International Critics' Week (9e Semaine de la Critique):

 Camarades by Marin Karmitz (France)
 Eloge du chiac by Michel Brault (Canada)
 Kes by Ken Loach (United Kingdom)
 Misshandlingen by Lars Lennart Forsberg (Sweden)
 O Cerco by Antonio Cunha Telles (Portugal)
 On voit bien que c’est pas toi by Christian Zarifian (France)
 Ramparts of Clay (Remparts d’argile) by Jean-Louis Bertucelli (France, Algeria)
 The River Schooners (Les Voitures d’eau) by Pierre Perrault (Canada)
 Soleil O by Med Hondo (Mauritania, France)
 Vrane by Gordan Mihić and Ljubiša Kozomara (Yugoslavia)
 Warm in the Bud by Rudolph Caringi (United States)
 Ice by Robert Kramer (United States)

Directors' Fortnight
The following films were screened for the 1970 Directors' Fortnight (Quinzaine des Réalizateurs):

 A nous deux, France by Désiré Ecaré (Ivory Coast, France)
 L'Araignée d'eau by Jean-Daniel Verhaeghe (France)
 Arthur Penn: Themes, Variants, Images & Words [doc.) by Robert Hughes (United States)
 Bhuvan Shome by Mrinal Sen (India)
 Caliche sangriento by Helvio Soto (Chile)
 I Cannibali by Liliana Cavani (Italy)
 Cowards by Simon Nuchtern (United States)
 Des Christs par milliers by Philippe Arthuys (France)
 Détruisez-vous by Serge Bard (France)
 Don Giovanni by Carmelo Bene (Italy)
 Eikka Katappa by Werner Schroeter (West Germany)
 End Of The Road by Aram Avakian (United States)
 Entre tu et vous by Michel Brault and Gilles Groulx (Canada)
 L'Escadron Volapük by René Gilson (France)
 L'Étrangleur by Paul Vecchiali (France)
 Even Dwarfs Started Small (Auch Zwerge haben klein angefangen) by Werner Herzog (West Germany)
 Un Film by Sylvina Boissonnas (France)
 Fuoricampo by Peter Del Monte (Italy)
 Give God a Chance on Sunday (Dieu existe tous les dimanches) by Henrik Stangerup (Denmark)
 Handcuffs (Lisice) by Krsto Papić (Yugoslavia)
 La Hora de los niños by Arturo Ripstein (Mexico)
 The House of Light (La Chambre Blanche) by Jean Pierre Lefebvre (Canada)
 The Howl (L'urlo) by Tinto Brass (Italy)
 The Inheritors (Os Herdeiros) by Carlos Diegues (Brazil)
 James ou pas by Michel Soutter (Switzerland)
 Jänken by Lars Forsberg (Sweden)
 Jutrzenka by Jaime Camino (Spain)
 Killed the Family and Went to the Movies (Matou a Família e Foi ao Cinema) by Júlio Bressane (Brazil)
 Macunaíma by Joaquim Pedro de Andrade (Brazil)
 A Married Couple (doc.) by Allan King (Canada)
 Molo by Wojciech Solarz (Poland)
 My Friend Pierrette (Mon amie Pierrette) by Jean Pierre Lefebvre (Canada)
 L'Odyssée du général José by Jorge Fraga (Cuba)
 L'Opium et le Bâton by Ahmed Rachedi (Algeria)
 Palaver by Emile Degelin (Belgium)
 Paradise Now (doc.) by Sheldon Rochlin (United Kingdom)
 Portrait by Jérôme Hill (United States)
 Une Pulsation by Carlos Paez Vilaro and Gérard Levy-Clerc (France, Uruguay)
 Putney Swope by Robert Downey Sr. (United States)
 Q-Bec My Love by Jean Pierre Lefebvre (Canada)
 Reason Over Passion by Joyce Wieland (Canada)
 Reconstituirea by Lucian Pintilie (Romania)
 Le Révélateur by Philippe Garrel (France)
 Right On by Herbert Danska (United States)
 Ruchome piaski by Władysław Ślesicki (Poland)
 School Play by Charles Rydell (United States)
 Som Natt Och Dag by Jonas Cornell (Sweden)
 Struktura kryształu by Krzysztof Zanussi (Poland)
 Sweet Hunters (Ternos caçadores) by Ruy Guerra (Panama)
 Troupe d'élite, fleur de Marie by Oimel Mai (West Germany)
 Valparaiso, mi amor by Aldo Francia (Chile)
 Wie Ich ein Neger wurde by Roland Gall (West Germany)
 Wind from the East (Le Vent d'est) by Jean-Luc Godard (Italy)
 Les Yeux ne veulent pas en tout temps se fermer by Jean-Marie Straub and Danièle Huillet (West Germany)

Short films

 20 September by Kurt Kren (France)
 Aaa by Dieter Meier (France)
 Ai Love by Takahiko Limura (France)
 All My Life by Bruce Baillie (United States)
 American Woman by Bruce E. Meintjies (United States)
 Back And Forth by Michael Snow (United States)
 Bartleby 1970 by Jean-Pierre Bastid (France)
 Béjart by Atahualpa Lichy (France)
 Berkeley by Patrick Reynolds (United States)
 Bliss by Gregory Markopoulos (France)
 Cosinus Alpha by Kurt Kren (France)
 Das Sonnenbad by Bernd Upnmoor (West Germany)
 David Perry by Albie Thoms (Australia)
 Dimanche Après-midi by Stéphane Kurc (France)
 Disson. Zeitreih by Hans Peter Kochenrath (France)
 Eros, O Basil by Gregory Markopoulos (France)
 Faces by John Moore and Takahiko Limura (France)
 Fenstergucker by Kurt Kren (France)
 Film Oder Macht by Vlado Kristl (France)
 Georges Albert, Aventurier by Daniel Edinger (France)
 In The Void by Ronald Bijlsma (Netherlands)
 It's So Peaceful by Fritz André Kracht (France)
 La Bergère En Colère by Francis Warin (France)
 La Cazadora Inconsciente by Rafael R. Balerdi (Spain)
 La Question ordinaire by Claude Miller (France)
 La Tête Froide by Patrick Hella (Belgium)
 Labyrinthe by Piotr Kamler (France)
 Le Coo by Paul Dopff (France)
 Le Voyage De M. Guitton by Pascal Aubier (France)
 Les Trois Cousins by René Vautier (France)
 Manha Cinzenta by Olney A. Sau Paulo (Brazil)
 Mauern by Kurt Kren (France)
 Messages, Messages by Steven Arnold (United States)
 One More Time by Daniel Pommereulle (France)
 Papa und Mama by Kurt Kren (France)
 Park Rape by Jon Beckjord (United States)
 Piece Mandala by Paul Sharits (France)
 Play 4 + 5 by Klaus Schönherr (France)
 Portrait D. Cor by Klaus Schönherr (France)
 Portraits by Gregory Markopoulos (France)
 S.W.B. by Gérard Pires (France)
 Scenes From by Stan Brakhage (France)
 Selbst Verst by Selbst Verst (France)
 Sodoma by Otto Muehl (France)
 Some Won't Go by Gil Toff (United States)
 Still Nacht by Hans Peter Kochenrath (France)
 Stock Exchange Transplant by Douglas Collins (United States)
 T,O,U,C,H,I,N,G by Paul Sharits (France)
 Talla by Malcolm Le Grice (France)
 The Mechanical Man by Ronald Fritz (United States)
 Underground Explosion by Kurt Kren (France)
 Vite by Daniel Pommereulle (France)
 Work In Progress by W. Hein and G. Hein (France)
 Zelenka by Robert Rosen (United States)

Awards

Official awards
The following films and people received the 1970 Official selection awards:
Grand Prix du Festival International du Film: MASH by Robert Altman
Grand Prix Spécial du Jury: Investigation of a Citizen Above Suspicion (Indagine su un cittadino al di sopra di ogni sospetto) by Elio Petri
Best Director: John Boorman for Leo the Last
Best Actress: Ottavia Piccolo for Metello
Best Actor: Marcello Mastroianni for The Pizza Triangle (Dramma della gelosia - tutti i particolari in cronaca)
Jury Prize (Tied as the jury was bitterly divided with half of its members wanting the film to receive the Golden Palm):
The Falcons (Magasiskola) - István Gaál
The Strawberry Statement - Stuart Hagmann
Best First Work: Hoa-Binh by Raoul Coutard
Short films
Prix du Jury: The Magic Machines by Bob Curtis
Special Mention: Et Salammbo? by Jean-Pierre Richard

Independent awards
FIPRESCI
FIPRESCI Prize: Investigation of a Citizen Above Suspicion (Indagine su un cittadino al di sopra di ogni sospetto) by Elio Petri
Commission Supérieure Technique
Technical Grand Prize: Le Territoire des autres by François Bel

References

Media
INA: Opening of the 1970 Cannes Festival (commentary in French)

External links
1970 Cannes Film Festival (web.archive)
Official website Retrospective 1970 
Cannes Film Festival Awards for 1970 at Internet Movie Database

Cannes Film Festival, 1970
Cannes Film Festival, 1970
Cannes Film Festival